The Inter-Agency Guiding Principles on Unaccompanied and Separated Children is a document and set of guidelines agreed upon among six international organizations, including:
 International Committee of the Red Cross (ICRC)
 International Rescue Committee (IRC)
 Save the Children UK (SCUK)
 United Nations Children’s Fund (UNICEF)
 United Nations High Commissioner for Refugees (UNHCR)
 World Vision International (WVI)

External links
Inter-Agency Guiding Principles on Unaccompanied and Separated Children
Full text

International Red Cross and Red Crescent Movement